Syaiful Lewenusa (born June 13, 1986 in Masohi, Seram, Central Maluku Regency) is an Indonesian footballer who currently plays for Persiba Balikpapan in the Indonesia Super League.

Club statistics

Hounors

Clubs
Persisam Putra Samarinda :
Liga Indonesia Premier Division champions : 1 (2008-09)

References

External links

1986 births
Living people
Indonesian Muslims
Moluccan people
People from Maluku (province)
Indonesian footballers
Association football defenders
Liga 1 (Indonesia) players
Persiba Balikpapan players
Persisam Putra Samarinda players
Indonesian Premier Division players
PSP Padang players
PSCS Cilacap players